Route 133 is a mostly east/west provincial highway in the Canadian province of New Brunswick.

Route description
The road is a continuation of Route 134 in Gilberts Corner. The road has a length of approximately 28 kilometres, and services small, otherwise isolated rural communities. In these areas, the highway is often unofficially referred to as "Main Street." The road runs mostly between the Northumberland Strait and Route 15 and a small portion of Route 11 in Greater Shediac. The road starts out as Hannington Road in Gilberts Corner, and is known as Main Street in Shediac. It is designated Acadie Road throughout most of the way to Route 15.

Intersecting routes
 Route 134 in Gilberts Corner
 Route 140 in the Rings Corner neighbourhood of Shediac at the Parlee Beach Intersection
 Route 933 in Barachois
 Route 950 in Dupuis Corner
 Route 945 in Cap-Pelé
 Route 15 near Botsford Portage

River crossings
 Scoudouc River in Shediac
 Aboujagane River in Robichaud
 Kouchibouguac River in Robichaud

Communities along the Route
Gilberts Corner
Chapman Corner
Shediac
Rings Corner
Boudreau
Barachois
Robichaud
Dupuis Corner
Cap-Pelé
Botsford Portage

See also
List of New Brunswick provincial highways

References

133
133
Shediac